Falsuszafrona idalina is a species of sea snail, a marine gastropod mollusk in the family Columbellidae, the dove snails.

Description

Distribution
This marine species occurs off Guadeloupe.

References

 Pelorce J. (2020). Les Columbellidae collectés dans les eaux profondes autour de l'île de Guadeloupe (Antilles Françaises) pendant la campagne KARUBENTHOS 2 (2015) du Muséum National d'Histoire Naturelle. Iberus. 38(1): 55-111

External links
 Duclos P.L. (1840). Histoire naturelle générale et particulière de tous les genres de coquilles univalves marines a l'état vivant et fossile, publiée par monographie. Genre Colombelle. Didot, Paris. 13 pl

Columbellidae
Gastropods described in 1840